Lakshmanayyar Rama Swamy (born 16 October 1944) is an author, translator and short story writer from Visakhapatnam, Andhra Pradesh. His work "Sufi Cheppina Katha" got the Sahitya Academy Award for Telugu Translation of Malayalam Novel "Sufi Paranja Katha" written by KP Ramanunni for the year 2015.

Biography
Swamy was born to TK Lakshmana Ayyar and Rajammall  in 1944. His mother tongue is Tamil. His school education was completed in Thrissur, Kerala.  He shifted to Visakhapatnam after he got a job in Andhra Petro Chemicals. Currently he is serving as President  of Mosaic Literary Organisation and Sahridaya Sahiti. Swamy also translated well known Telugu writers poetry into Malayalam. This list includes N.Gopi, Sikhamani, P.Vijayalakshmi Pandit. He also translated stories of Gurajada Apparao, Kethu Vishwanatha Reddy and Jayanthi Paparao's stories in Malayalam. Translation of Mahakavi Srisri's Monograph and Divakarla Venkata Avadhani's Andhra Vagmaya Charitra are also in the credits of Shri.Swamy.

Telugu books
Godavari Station (Collection of Stories)
Aatavika Rajyam (Translation of stories written by Tamil author R.Natarajan)
Sareeram oka Nagaram (Translation of Malayalam Poems written by K.Sacchidanandan)
Sametala Kathalu (Mini Stories)
Kathakasam (Collection of Stories)
Sufi cheppina katha (Translation of Malayalam Novel written by K.P. Ramanunni)
Pandavapuram (Translation of Malayalam Novel written by Sethu)
Kathaswamyam (Collection of Stories)
Loguttu Perumallukeruka (Collection of Stories)
Folk songs of Kerala (Translation of songs written by K. Ayyappa Phanikar)
Konda Dorasani (Translation of Malayalam Novel written by Narayan)
Katha Keralam (Translation of Malayalam Stories)
Mudralu (Translation of Malayalam Novel)
Brahmarshi Sri Narayana Guru (Translation of book written by T.Baskaran)
Katha Vaaradi (Translation of Malayalam Stories)
  KATHADOWTHYAM [Translation of Malayalam stories]
  SPANDANAAMAPINULAKU DHANYAVAADALU[Translation of Malayalamnovel]
  ALAGA, ALAGA KATHALU. [Collection of Telugu stories]
  Janappaana   [Translation of Malayalam poem]

References

 Article in Business Standard
 G.V.Prasada Sarma (10 March 2016)."Multi-lingual forays into literature"
 Official Website of Sahitya Akademi
 The Hans India Newspaper, Article dated 21 February 2016, Translation a local text in a global character

Living people
1944 births
Telugu writers